Captain Edward Stamp (5 November 1814 – 20 January 1876) was an English mariner and entrepreneur who contributed to the early economic development of British Columbia and Vancouver Island. Born at Alnwick in Northumberland, Stamp served as the captain of a steam transport in the Crimean War in 1854.

History
In 1865, he formed the British Columbia and Vancouver Island Spar, Lumber and Saw Mill Company to establish a sawmill and logging rights on Burrard Inlet. The company first attempted to locate the mill at Brockton Point in what is now Stanley Park, but inshore currents and a nearby reef made the site impractical and the site was shifted about a mile farther east, on the south side of the inlet. Because of several business challenges, and perhaps his own difficult personality, Stamp's relationship with the company and his management position came to an end on 2 January 1869. In 1870 the mill was renamed Hastings Mill and eventually seeded the settlement from which the city of Vancouver developed.

The stamp had a minor career in politics, serving on the Legislative Council of British Columbia in 1867 and 1868. He died at Turnham Green, Middlesex, on 20 January 1872.

See also

Hastings Mill

References

External links
 Stamp's Mill and Gastown
 Biography at the Dictionary of Canadian Biography Online

Canadian businesspeople
People from Alnwick
1814 births
1872 deaths
Members of the Legislative Council of British Columbia
English emigrants to pre-Confederation British Columbia
Pre-Confederation British Columbia people